Antal Barát-Lemberkovits (13 June 1903 – 16 October 1980) was a Hungarian sports shooter who won more than 30 national titles. He competed in the 50 m rifle, prone event at the 1932 Summer Olympics. He later changed his name to Antal Simonfay and emigrated to Argentina.

References

External links
 

1903 births
1980 deaths
Hungarian male sport shooters
Olympic shooters of Hungary
Shooters at the 1932 Summer Olympics
Sportspeople from Borsod-Abaúj-Zemplén County
20th-century Hungarian people